Michael Hugh Clark (born March 30, 1959) is an American former college and professional football player who was a defensive end in the National Football League (NFL) and United States Football League (USFL) for five seasons during the 1980s.  Clark played college football for the University of Florida, and thereafter, he played professionally for the Washington Redskins, the San Francisco 49ers and the Tampa Bay Buccaneers of the NFL, and the Tampa Bay Bandits of the USFL.

Early years 

Clark was born in Dothan, Alabama in 1959.  He attended Graceville High School in Graceville, Florida, where he played high school football for the Graceville Tigers.

College career 

Clark accepted an athletic scholarship to attend the University of Florida in Gainesville, Florida, and played for coach Doug Dickey and coach Charley Pell's Florida Gators football teams from 1977 to 1980.  During Clark's senior season in 1980, he was a member of the Gators team that posted the biggest one-year turnaround in the history of NCAA Division I football—from 0–10–1 in 1979 to an 8–4 bowl team in 1980.

Professional career 

The Los Angeles Rams selected Clark in the seventh round (190th pick overall) of the 1981 NFL Draft. Clark was also a starting defensive end for coach Steve Spurrier's Tampa Bay Bandits of the USFL in 1984 and 1985.

Life after football 

Clark is retired from professional sports and lives in Tampa, Florida.
He has one daughter.

See also 

 Florida Gators football, 1970–79
 Florida Gators football, 1980–89
 History of the San Francisco 49ers
 History of the Tampa Bay Buccaneers
 List of Florida Gators in the NFL Draft
 List of Washington Redskins players

References

Bibliography 

 Carlson, Norm, University of Florida Football Vault: The History of the Florida Gators, Whitman Publishing, LLC, Atlanta, Georgia (2007).  .
 Golenbock, Peter, Go Gators!  An Oral History of Florida's Pursuit of Gridiron Glory, Legends Publishing, LLC, St. Petersburg, Florida (2002).  .
 Hairston, Jack, Tales from the Gator Swamp: A Collection of the Greatest Gator Stories Ever Told, Sports Publishing, LLC, Champaign, Illinois (2002).  .
 McCarthy, Kevin M.,  Fightin' Gators: A History of University of Florida Football, Arcadia Publishing, Mount Pleasant, South Carolina (2000).  .
 Nash, Noel, ed., The Gainesville Sun Presents The Greatest Moments in Florida Gators Football, Sports Publishing, Inc., Champaign, Illinois (1998).  .

1959 births
Living people
American football defensive ends
Florida Gators football players
Sportspeople from Dothan, Alabama
People from Jackson County, Florida
San Francisco 49ers players
Tampa Bay Buccaneers players
Washington Redskins players
Chicago Bruisers players
National Football League replacement players